The Calgary Dinos women's ice hockey team represents the University of Calgary in U Sports women's ice hockey. The Dinos compete in the Canada West Universities Athletic Association Conference in the U Sports athletic association. The program has won one conference championship in 2012 and have made five national championship appearances with a gold medal win in 2012.

History

Former two-time Olympic gold medalist and eight-time world champion Danielle Goyette was named head coach of the team in May 2007 and continued in that role through to the cancelled 2020–21 season, being named the Canada West Coach of the Year for 2019–2020.

On September 16, 2010, Hayley Wickenheiser announced that she would return to the University of Calgary to complete her Kinesiology degree. She also announced that she would join the Dinos women's hockey team. On October 8, 2011, Hayley Wickenheiser played in her first CIS game with the Dinos. She earned first star honours and had two goals and one assist. By season's end, Wickenheiser appeared in only 15 of 24 games due to injury and commitments with Team Canada. She tied for the conference scoring lead with 40 points and led Canada West with 17 goals on the season. Her 2.67 points-per-game average led CIS hockey. She recorded four short-handed goals on the year along with five game-winners and finished with a +22 rating. She led Canada West in all of these categories, respectively. She is the first Dino in program history to be named the Canada West MVP and the first conference all-star since the 2000 season. On March 9, 2011: As a first-year forward for the University of Calgary, Hayley Wickenheiser was named the Canadian Interuniversity Sport player of the year in women's hockey. She then became the first ever Dino to win the Brodrick Trophy as CIS MVP.

On February 25, 2012, Iya Gavrilova scored the game-winning goal in the deciding game of the 2012 Canada West tournament, as the Calgary Dinos claimed their first ever tournament title.

Year by year

Awards and honours
Kelsey Roberts, Canada West Female Second Star Athlete of the Week (Week 14: Jan.7, 2020) 
Iya Gavrilova, 2015 Brodrick Trophy winner
Hayley Wickenheiser, First Star of Game (October 8, 2010)
Elizabeth Lang, Fastest Hat-Trick in CW History (Time 5:55) (November 27, 2022)

USports Awards
Amanda Tapp, 2012 CIS Championship MVP
Hayley Wickenheiser, 2011 Brodrick Trophy (CIS MVP)

All-Canadians
Kelsey Roberts, 2019-2020 All-Canadian First Team All Star 
Alexandra Vafina, 2015-2016 All-Canadian First Team All-Star 
Iya Gavrilova, 2015-2016 All-Canadian First Team All-Star 
Iya Gavrilova, 2014-15 All-Canadian First Team All-Star 
Stephanie Ramsay, 2012-13 USports First Team All-Star
Hayley Wickenheiser, 2012-2013 All-Canadian First Team All-Star 
Hayley Wickenheiser, 2011-2012 All-Canadian Second Team All-Star 
Carol Scheibel, 1999-2000 All-Canadian Second Team All-Star 
Colleen Sostorics, 1998-1999 All-Canadian Second Team All-Star 
Kelly Bechard, 1997-1998 All-Canadian First Team All-Star 
Colleen Sostorics, 1997-1998 All-Canadian Second Team All-Star

Canada West Awards
Jenna Smith, 2011 Canada West Rookie of the Year
Danielle Goyette, 2019-2020 Canada West Conference Coach of the Year
Hayley Wickenheiser was named the Canada West female athlete of the week on November 2, 2010 after scoring three goals and adding an assist in two games against the University of Alberta.

Hall of Fame
Hayley Wickenheiser: Canada West Hall of Fame - 2021 Inductee

Player of the Year
Kelsey Roberts, 2019-2020 Canada West Conference Women's Hockey Player of the Year
Iya Gavrilova, 2015 Canada West Conference Player of the Year
Hayley Wickenheiser, 2011 Canada West Player of the Year

Canada West All-Stars

2012 Canada West First Team All-Star: Iya Gavrilova, Forward
2012 Canada West First Team All-Star: Stephanie Ramsay, Forward
2012 Canada West First Team All-Star: Hayley Wickenheiser, Forward
2012 Canada West Second Team All-Star: Melissa Zubick, Forward
2015 Canada West First Team All-Star: Iya Gavrilova, Forward
2020 Canada West First Team All-Star: Kelsey Roberts, Goaltender
2020 Canada West First Team All-Star: Elizabeth Lang, Forward
2020 Canada West Second Team All-Star: Paige Michalenko, Defense
2022 Canada West Second Team All-Star: Elizabeth Lang, Forward

University Awards
2019-20 University of Calgary Athlete of the Year: Kelsey Roberts

Dinos in pro hockey

International
Alexandra Vafina : 2015 Winter Universiade, 2017 Winter Universiade

References

University of Calgary
U Sports women's ice hockey teams
Women's ice hockey teams in Canada
Ice hockey teams in Alberta
Ice hockey teams in Calgary
Calgary Dinos
Women in Alberta